Denis Olegov is a Bulgarian writer and journalist from Russian descent. Olegov has authored five books with poems and prose so far. The most recent is "A eternal foreigner".

Biography 
Denis Olegov Molodtsov was born on 9 February 1998 in Sofia, Bulgaria. At the age of 13 he began writing poems. His early works were published in the online page "Street of dreams~". Furthermore, Olegov published his poems in some Bulgarian websites under the pseudonym "Akinfa".

In April 2014 Olegov released his first book, titled "Rimodraskanici", which is the name of the author's Facebook page. Later that year he published his second work "The Division Of A Soul".

In 2015 Olegov began working for The Bulgarian television Eurocom Sofia, where he gave commentary on some football matches from Campeonato Brasileiro Série A alongside Stanimir Bakalov, Boyko Kotev and Kristian Krasteva. At the same time he was a reporter for Eurocom's sports show Ultrasport. Olegov has publications in Bulgarian websites Fanface, Gol and Kafene.

In July 2015 the author received his first award for his poem "Roots", given to him for winning the poetic competition "Against the wind" (Срещу вятъра) . In November 2015 Olegov was awarded with second place at the contest "Unknown streets" (Непознати улици). Some of Olegov's works were published in the online compilation of Bulgarian literature "Manu prophia".

In the beginning of 2016 Olegov's poem "Love writing" took first place at the contest "Golden Yavor" in the category "under 20 y.o" On the 13th of January 2016 the author's third book "Iced Ember" (Ледена жар) was released. The book's cover was done by his classmate Viara Stefcheva. Olegov started his own blog, called "Olegovism".

In 2017 Olegov switched to social poetry and had numerous publications in the online magazine "New social poetry". In March 2017 Denis's first book of poetry and prose -"The Wheel Of History". Poems "Moonlight poem" and "Amphibious life" received awards on contests "Young poet - Kostinbrod" and "Wish for developing creation". In 2017-2018 Olegov published several works in "New asocial poetry" and "Literature world". In June 2018 he was awarded on "Sky meridians" contest in Israel.

In 2019 Olegov won the national contest "Dimitar Boyadziev" and because of that he released his book "A eternal foreigner" (publishing house "Lexicon") in June 2020.

Denis Olegov is the co-founder of the literature' club "Beyond The Covers" (Отвъд кориците).

Bibliography

Solo 
 "Rimodraskanici" (2014)
 "The split of the soul" (2014)
 "Ice and fire" (2016)
 "The wheel of the history" (2017)
 "A eternal foreigner" (2020)

Other 
 "Manu propria vol. 3" (2015)
 "Black mirror" (2017) (with Todor Iliev)
 "Absent" (2017)

References

External links 
 Olegovism
 Facebook page
 Goodreads profile
 Stihi.ru profile
 Profile in LiterNet
 Profile in Literaturen Svyat
 Denis Olegov in Poetas del Mundo

Bulgarian male poets
21st-century Bulgarian poets
Bulgarian journalists
Bulgarian bloggers
Bulgarian people of Russian descent
1998 births
Living people
21st-century male writers
Male bloggers